The 2000 US Open was a tennis tournament played on outdoor hard courts at the USTA National Tennis Center in New York City in New York in the United States of America. It was the 120th edition of the US Open and was held from 28 August through 10 September 2000.

Serena Williams and Venus Williams were the defending champions, but withdrew from their semifinal match against Cara Black and Elena Likhovtseva.

Julie Halard-Decugis and Ai Sugiyama won the title, defeating Cara Black and Elena Likhovtseva 6–0, 1–6, 6–1 in the final. It was the first and only Grand Slam doubles title for Halard-Decugis, and the first Grand Slam doubles title for Sugiyama, in their respective careers.

Seeds

Qualifying

Draw

Finals

Top half

Section 1

Section 2

Bottom half

Section 3

Section 4

External links
 Official Results Archive (WTA)
2000 US Open – Women's draws and results at the International Tennis Federation

2000 US Open (tennis)
US Open (tennis) by year – Women's doubles
2000 in women's tennis
2000 in American women's sports
Women's sports in New York (state)
Women in New York City
2000 in sports in New York City